WMCP (1280 AM, "Columbia's Country") is a radio station broadcasting a country music format. Licensed to Columbia, Tennessee, United States, the station is currently owned by Maury County Boosters Corp. and features programming from Citadel Media.

History of call letters
The call letters WMCP previously were assigned to an FM station in Baltimore, Maryland. It began broadcasting March 14, 1948, and was owned and operated by Belvedere Broadcasting Corporation.

References

External links

Country radio stations in the United States
MCP
Columbia, Tennessee